Graikos may refer to:

 Graikos (name), a Greek name, the origin of the modern English noun "Greek" 
 Graikos, a village in Arcadia, Greece
 Graecus, the son of Pandora and Zeus